Kościelna Wieś  is a village in the administrative district of Gmina Węgliniec, within Zgorzelec County, Lower Silesian Voivodeship, in south-western Poland.

References

Villages in Zgorzelec County